The Royal Society Kohn Award was an award given by the Royal Society since 2005 to beginning scientists who had achieved significant cultural impact through broadcasting or public speech. It was funded by the Kohn Foundation (set up by Ralph Kohn) and consisted of a grant for £7,500 for science communication activities and a gift of £2,500.

Past winners
2013 Peter Vukusic
2012 Suzannah Lishman 
2011  Christopher Lintott
2010 No Award
2009 Lucie Green
2008 Chris Smith
2007 Carolyn Stephens
2006 Kathy Sykes
2005 Colin Pulham

References

2005 establishments in the United Kingdom
Awards established in 2005
Awards of the Royal Society
Early career awards
Science communication awards